Sargocentron rubrum, also known as redcoat, is a member of the family Holocentridae of the order Beryciformes. Squirrelfish in general are large, active, nocturnal fish which are usually red in color.

It is found in the wide Indo-Pacific, from the Red Sea to the West Pacific, where it ranges from southern Japan to New Caledonia, New South Wales (Australia) and recently Tonga. Observed since the mid-20th century in Levantine waters of the Mediterranean Sea, following entry via the Suez Canal, it is now very common through the entire eastern Basin.

References

External links

rubrum
Fish described in 1775
Taxa named by Peter Forsskål